My Friend is a 1983 Bolivian drama film directed by Paolo Agazzi. It was entered into the 13th Moscow International Film Festival.

Cast
 Guillermo Barrios as Cura
 Juana Fernández as Doña Sabasta
 Susana Hernández as Matilde
 Hugo Pozo as Mecanico
 Mariel Rivera as Arminda
 Carlos Sandallo as Novio
 Gerardo Suárez as Brillo
 David Sàntalla as Don Vito
 Blanca Irene Uría as Betty
 Miriam Villagómez as Novia

References

External links
 

1983 films
1983 drama films
Bolivian drama films
1980s Spanish-language films
Films directed by Paolo Agazzi